Tamara Tilinger (born 14 February 1989, in Székesfehérvár) is a retired Hungarian handballer who played for Cornexi Alcoa, Dunaferr NK and Mosonmagyaróvári KC SE during her career.

She made her international debut on 30 May 2010 against Azerbaijan.

Achievements
 Nemzeti Bajnokság I:
 Silver Medallist: 2008
 Nemzeti Bajnokság I/B:
 Winner: 2018
 Magyar Kupa:
 Silver Medallist: 2008
 Bronze Medallist: 2011
 EHF Cup:
 Semifinalist: 2008
 World University Championship:
 Winner: 2010

References

1989 births
Living people
Hungarian female handball players
Sportspeople from Székesfehérvár
Fehérvár KC players